Challenge of the Dragon is an unlicensed game developed and published by Color Dreams in 1990 for the Nintendo Entertainment System.

Plot
Times were once serene in the lush lands of Lorin, long before technology and evil. The evil necromancer Demiwind has appeared. As a child, this seemingly harmless soul spent his time idly whittling away the hours with magically insignificant spells. Young Demiwind would make an egg float here, a chicken there, or simply conjure a lizard man or two to do this chores for him. Then disaster and puberty struck, rendering young Demiwind a walking testosterone magic machine with an eye for mischief. Some would maintain that wiping out entire villages by accident on purpose was more than mischief.

Characters
Sir Burkelot - The main character who grew up learning dragon style kung fu.
Lady Ninita - Sir Burkelot's girlfriend who has been kidnapped by the evil wizard Demiwind. Her name bears a resemblance to Nina Stanley who worked on many Color Dreams titles.
Demiwind - The main antagonist of the game. An evil wizard who took Lady Ninita.

External links
Challenge of the Dragon at GameFAQs

1990 video games
Beat 'em ups
Color Dreams games
Fantasy video games set in the Middle Ages
Nintendo Entertainment System games
Nintendo Entertainment System-only games
North America-exclusive video games
Platform games
Unauthorized video games
Side-scrolling video games
Single-player video games
Video games about dragons
Video games developed in the United States